The History of Advertising Trust was established in 1976 to preserve and protect the heritage of UK advertising history and to offer it for research and study. It was registered as a UK charity (no. 276194) in 1978 and operates on a not-for-profit basis.

The Trust runs HAT Archive at the Raveningham Centre, Raveningham, Norfolk, NR14 6NU.

HAT's remit has grown to embrace all forms of brand communications, including retail marketing, public relations, direct marketing and media in all forms.

HAT offers a comprehensive image and reference library, research services and a professional storage service for marketing and agency archives.

It is archivist to many companies and advertising agencies as well as to organisations such as the Advertising Association and the Institute of Practitioners in Advertising (for further details, see website).

HAT archive has been said to be the largest archive of UK advertising in the world - see OUP's history of UK advertising, Powers of Persuasion, for example, and for some background to HAT's early years.

There are some adverts from Ireland and other countries online too.

See also 
Advertising
Television commercials
Television advertising
Posters
Outdoor advertising

References

External links
 The History of Advertising Trust official website

Advertising agencies of the United Kingdom
Archives in Norfolk
Advertising organizations